The River Robe is a river in County Mayo, Ireland. 

The river's name in Irish is An Róba, first recorded as Rodba in mediaeval manuscripts, perhaps from Old Irish rodba, "sharp, aggressive".

The river is the longest tributary of Lough Mask and it drains 320 square kilometres of south Mayo. 

The Robe's Environmental Protection Agency River ID is 30_1579.

Course of the river

The Robe rises about five kilometres southwest of Ballyhaunis and follows a meandering path southwest through the townland of Keebagh and Brickens village. It turns gently to the west between Tootagh and Garryduff and continues west between Claremorris and Ballindine. It meanders in serpentine coils beside the R331 road, passing Taugheen, from where it begins its southwesterly descent to Hollymount. From there, the river winds in broad loops before descending southwestwards into Ballinrobe. The Robe empties into Lough Mask, four kilometres west of Ballinrobe, near Cushlough.

See also
 Rivers of Ireland
 List of rivers of County Mayo

References

External links

 The River Robe, poem by Lord Oranmore and Browne.
 On the Banks of the Robe River and More Claremorris Memories by Michael J. Reidy.
 Dáil written answer concerning flooding by the Robe
 Fishing in Mayo

Rivers of County Mayo